Zheltukhin is a rural locality (a khutor) in Avilovskoye Rural Settlement, Ilovlinsky District, Volgograd Oblast, Russia. The population was 463 as of 2010. There are 12 streets.

Geography 
Zheltukhin is located in steppe, on the right bank of the Ilovlya River, 4 km northwest of Ilovlya (the district's administrative centre) by road. Tary is the nearest rural locality.

References 

Rural localities in Ilovlinsky District